"Heard It All" is a song by Australian rapper Illy and was released in May 2012 as the lead single from Illy's third studio album, Bring It Back. "Heard It All" peaked at number 48 on the ARIA Charts; Illy's first top 50 charting single. "Heard It All" was certified gold in Australia in 2015.

Reception
Beat Magazine said Illy's "Heard It All" had won him over with "cunning reverse psychology" saying "I don't know how to process hip hop with genuine humility in it."

Charts

Certifications

References 

2012 singles
2012 songs
Illy (rapper) songs
Songs written by Illy (rapper)